Francesco Antonio Leopardi (1635–1717) was a Roman Catholic prelate who served as Bishop of Tricarico (1685–1717) and Bishop of Marsico Nuovo (1683–1685).

Biography
Francesco Antonio Leopardi was born in 1635 in Buonabitacolo, Italy and ordained a priest on 14 March 1671.

On 27 September 1683, he was appointed during the papacy of Pope Innocent XI as Bishop of Marsico Nuovo.
On 3 October 1683, he was consecrated bishop by Alessandro Crescenzi, Cardinal-Priest of Santa Prisca. 
On 1 October 1685, he was appointed during the papacy of Pope Innocent XI as Bishop of Tricarico.
He served as Bishop of Tricarico until his death on 5 February 1717.

References

External links and additional sources
 (for Chronology of Bishops) (for Chronology of Bishops) 
 (for Chronology of Bishops) 
 (for Chronology of Bishops) 
 (for Chronology of Bishops) 

17th-century Italian Roman Catholic bishops
18th-century Italian Roman Catholic bishops
Bishops appointed by Pope Innocent XI
1635 births
1717 deaths